X.com was an online bank co-founded by Elon Musk, Harris Fricker, Christopher Payne, and Ed Ho in 1999 in Palo Alto, California. In 2000, X.com merged with competitor Confinity Inc., a software company also based in Palo Alto. Musk was attracted to Confinity because of its easy payment system. The merged company changed its name to PayPal. eBay bought PayPal for US$1.5 billion in 2002. In 2015, PayPal was spun off and became an independent company.

Business model
X.com was an early online bank, and deposits were insured by the FDIC. The company was initially funded by Elon Musk and Greg Kouri, who went on to fund Musk's later ventures: Tesla and his startup, SpaceX.

Customers were not assessed fees or overdraft penalties; in fact, they were rewarded for signing up with a $20 cash card and a $10 card for new member referrals. These features were distinct for their time. For instance, customers could send money to another person by entering their email address into X.com. Additionally, customers could open an account strictly with online registration with no need to mail a check.

History
Throughout the 1990s, Elon Musk envisioned creating a full-service online bank that provided checking and savings accounts, brokerages, and insurance. Musk commented in a 1999 interview with CBS MarketWatch: "I think we're at the third stage now where people are ready to use the Internet as their main financial repository."

In January 1999, Musk formally began planning an online bank while in the process of selling his company Zip2. A month after Zip2 was purchased by Compaq, Musk invested about $12 million into co-founding X.com in March 1999 with Harris Fricker, Christopher Payne, and Ed Ho. Fricker worked with Musk when Musk was an intern at the Bank of Nova Scotia, Payne was a friend of Fricker, and Ho was an engineer at Silicon Graphics and executive at Zip2. The company was initially run from a house before moving to an office in Palo Alto, California. 
Due to conflict on how to run the company, Musk fired Fricker five months after x.com had started, and the other two co-founders, Payne and Ho left consequently. 

X.com officially launched on December 7, 1999, with former Intuit CEO Bill Harris serving as the inaugural CEO. Within two months, X.com attracted over 200,000 signups. 

In March 2000, X.com merged with Confinity, its fiercest competitor, the new company being called X.com. Musk was its biggest shareholder and was appointed as its CEO. Started in 1998, Confinity's product PayPal enabled users with PalmPilots to send money to each other through its infrared ports. Subsequently, PayPal developed to allow users to send money using email and the web.

In September 2000, when Musk was in Australia for a honeymoon trip, the X.com board voted for a change of CEO from Musk to Peter Thiel, the co-founder of Confinity. In June 2001, X.com was renamed PayPal.

On October 3, 2002, eBay purchased PayPal for US$1.5 billion.

In July 2015, PayPal was spun off to become an independent, publicly traded company.

On July 5, 2017, Musk repurchased the domain name X.com from PayPal. He explained later that he bought the website because "it has great sentimental value".

On July 14, 2017, X.com was launched again, consisting of a blank white page with one "x" in the top left corner, and a custom error page displaying a "y". The site displays this way due to having nothing in its source code except the single letter "x". In December 2017, X.com redirected visitors to The Boring Company's website, which Musk also owns. This was done in order to advertise a hat sale.

On October 4, 2022 Elon Musk described his acquisition of Twitter as "an accelerant to creating X, the everything app". This has been linked to x.com.
In conversation with Ron Baron a month later, Musk said he will execute the X product plan "with some improvements" which will make Twitter "the most valuable financial institution in the world."

See also

PayPal
Single-letter second-level domain

References 

Works cited

 
 
 
Notes

External links

Online banks
Elon Musk
American companies established in 1999
Banks established in 1999
PayPal